USC&GS Davidson was the name of two ships of the United States Coast and Geodetic Survey, and may refer to:

 , a launch in service from 1933 to 1935
 USC&GS Davidson (CSS 31), a coastal survey ship in service with the Coast and Geodetic Survey from 1967 to 1970 and, as the survey ship , with the National Oceanic and Atmospheric Administration from 1970 to 1989